David Joseph Mahoney (30 May 1892 – 29 March 1947) was an Australian rules footballer who played with Richmond in the Victorian Football League (VFL).

Notes

External links 
		

1892 births
1947 deaths
Australian rules footballers from Victoria (Australia)
Richmond Football Club players